Harold Balme (28 May 1878 in Hackney, Middlesex, England - 13 February 1953 in London) was a British medical missionary to China. He served as president of Cheeloo University from 1921 to 1927.

Biography
Balme studied medicine at King's College and King's College Hospital. He went to Taiyuan in Shanxi as a medical missionary in 1906. In 1913, he took a position as professor of surgery at Cheeloo University and superindent of the University's hospital.  Later, he was appointed dean of the university's medical school and president of the University in 1921.

Works
 Harold Balme, "Medical Missions in China", The Lancet, Vol. 198 No. 5119 pp 784–786, 1921
 Harold Balme, "China and Modern Medicine: A Study in Medical Missionary Development", London: United Council for Missionary Education, 1921.
 Harold Balme, "The trend of medical mission policy in China, International Review of Mission", Volume 13, Issue 2, pages 247-257, April 1924.

References

1878 births
1953 deaths
Alumni of King's College London
English Protestant missionaries
Protestant missionaries in China
Officers of the Order of the British Empire
Presidents of Cheeloo University
Fellows of the Royal College of Surgeons
Christian medical missionaries
British expatriates in China
People from Hackney Central